Frigid Hare is a Warner Bros. Merrie Melodies short, released on October 8, 1949. It is directed by Chuck Jones and written by Michael Maltese, and features Bugs Bunny. The title can be seen as a simple play on "frigid air" and/or on the refrigerator brand called "Frigidaire".

Plot
While traveling to Miami Beach for an overdue vacation from Warner Brothers, Bugs Bunny yet again misses the left turn at Albuquerque and ends up at the South Pole. As Bugs studies a map, a young penguin fleeing an Eskimo hunter knocks him down, then disappears into the distance. The pursuing Eskimo does the same, but immediately returns to 'ask' Bugs which way the penguin went. Bugs sends the hunter in the opposite direction. He then finds that the penguin has grown attached to him. Wanting to get back to his vacation, Bugs fools the penguin into thinking they will spend part of it together, then distracts him and pushes him down a snowbank, only to see him slide into the hunter's bag. Bugs starts to resume his journey, suggesting to himself that he is not responsible for what happens, but is quickly overcome by his better nature ("Oh, always somethin'! I'll never get to Miami!") and, through a clever ruse involving him disguising himself as a female Eskimo and followed by a chase and a close-call, he rescues the penguin. Bugs grumbles that he only has four days of vacation left. He learns from the penguin that, at the South Pole, the days are six months long. Figuring this means he can stretch his four-day vacation until July 1953, Bugs dons top hat and tails and accompanies the penguin on "a nice long formal vacation."

Home media
Frigid Hare is available, uncut and restored, on the third disc of Looney Tunes Golden Collection: Volume 1 (2003).

References

External links

 
 

 

1949 films
1949 short films
1949 animated films
1940s Warner Bros. animated short films
Merrie Melodies short films
Short films directed by Chuck Jones
Films set in Antarctica
Films scored by Carl Stalling
Animated films about rabbits and hares
Animated films about penguins
Stereotypes of Inuit people
Bugs Bunny films
Films with screenplays by Michael Maltese
1940s English-language films